Ruellia currorii is a species of plant in the family Acanthaceae. It is found in Angola and Namibia. Its natural habitat is cold desert.

References

currorii
Least concern plants
Taxonomy articles created by Polbot